Vilundavallen is a football stadium in Upplands Väsby. Vilundavallen has a total capacity of 3,600 spectators.

References

Football venues in Sweden